Megachile rawi is a species of bee in the family Megachilidae. It was described by Engel in 1999.

References

Rawi
Insects described in 1999
Taxa named by Michael S. Engel